Starr Hill may refer to:

Starr Hill Brewery, a beer brewing company based in Crozet, Virginia
Starr Hill, Juneau, a neighborhood in Juneau, Alaska
Starr Hill Presents, a music promotion company founded by Coran Capshaw
Starr Hill Township, Washington County, Arkansas, a township in Washington County, Arkansas

See also
Bukit Bintang, an entertainment district of Kuala Lumpur whose name translates to "Star Hill"
Star Hill AME Church, a historic church in Delaware